The Mount of Pai Inácio (Morro do Pai Inácio) is located in Chapada Diamantina National Park in Brazil It belongs to city of Palmeiras.

The Mount is 1,120 m high and it as the coordinates 12º27º'27"S 41º28'23"W

History 
A slave had a romance with a daughter of a farmer, and she got pregnant. The fearful slave ran away and jumped with an open umbrella, disappearing forever.

References 
 "Geography" http://www.lencois.com.br/hotel-pousada-na-chapada-diamantina/informativo-materia.php?id=96

Geography of Bahia